Parmatma (परमात्मा) is a 1978 Bollywood adventure film directed by Chand.

Cast
Shatrughan Sinha as Anand 
Rekha as Deepa 
Aruna Irani as Lily 
Imtiaz Khan as Zorawar Singh (as Imtiaz) 
Pradeep Kumar as Guruji Maharaj 'Swami' 
Ranjeet as Johnny 
Dev Kumar as Girdhari (Johnny's Father) 
Jagdish Raj as Inspector 
Chand Usmani   
Helen as Katorani (Bar Girl) 
Komilla Wirk  (as Komila Wirk)

Soundtrack

External links
 

1978 films
1970s Hindi-language films
1970s adventure films
Indian adventure films
Hindi-language adventure films